So Fresh: The Hits of Summer 2009 and the Best of 2008 is a compilation from So Fresh, first released on 28 November 2008.

Track listing

Disc 1
Pink – "So What" (3:35)
Britney Spears – "Womanizer" (3:43)
Lady Gaga – "Poker Face" (3:57)
The Presets – "Talk Like That" (3:40)
Kings of Leon – "Sex on Fire" (3:23)
The Pussycat Dolls – "I Hate This Part" (3:39)
Christina Aguilera – "Keeps Gettin' Better" (3:02)
Kate Miller-Heidke – "Can't Shake It" (3:15)
MGMT – "Kids" (5:03)
The Living End – "Moment in the Sun" (4:22)
Sam Sparro – "21st Century Life" (3:37)
Metro Station – "Shake It" (3:00)
Leona Lewis – "Bleeding Love" (4:22)
Newton Faulkner – "Dream Catch Me" (3:57)
Colbie Caillat – "Bubbly" (3:17)
Sara Bareilles – "Love Song" (4:18)
OneRepublic – "Stop and Stare" (3:43)
Short Stack – "Shimmy a Go Go" (3:43)
Lenka – "The Show" (3:55)
Pnau – "Baby" (2:48)

Disc 2
Jessica Mauboy featuring Flo Rida – "Running Back" (3:46)
Chris Brown featuring Keri Hilson: "Superhuman" (3:37)
Ne-Yo – "Miss Independent" (3:51)
Dizzee Rascal featuring Calvin Harris and Chrome – "Dance wiv Me" (3:23)
Secondhand Serenade – "Fall for You" (3:03)
Rihanna – "Don't Stop the Music" (4:28)
Natalie Bassingthwaighte – "Alive" (3:31)
The Ting Tings – "That's Not My Name" (5:08)
Jordin Sparks – "Tattoo" (3:52)
Alicia Keys – "No One" (4:14)
Kaz James – "We Hold On" (3:31)
Kelly Rowland – "Work" (3:11)
Nelly featuring Fergie – "Party People" (4:02)
The Potbelleez – "Are You with Me" (3:40)
Timbaland featuring Keri Hilson and Nicole Scherzinger – "Scream" (3:45)
Ashlee Simpson – "Outta My Head (Ay Ya Ya)" (3:37)
Brian McFadden – "Like Only a Woman Can" (3:51)
Mika – "Big Girl (You Are Beautiful)" (4:07)
Hook n Sling – "The Best Thing (2008)" (4:02)
Rogue Traders – "I Never Liked You" (3:30)

Certifications

References

External links 

 Track listing on AllMusic

So Fresh albums
2008 compilation albums
2009 in Australian music